Harpago is a genus of sea snails, marine gastropod mollusks in the family Strombidae, the true conchs.

Harpago ('grappling iron') is also a term used in insect morphology for the distal end of a genital clasper.

Species
Species within the genus Harpago include:

References

Strombidae
Gastropod genera